Marg (Pathway) is a quarterly Indian art magazine and a publisher of books on the arts, based in Mumbai. It began in 1946, with writer Mulk Raj Anand as its founding editor. He intended it to be a loose encyclopaedia of the arts of India and related civilizations.

The magazine was mainly funded by J.R.D. Tata of the Tata Group at its inception. Later on, after 1951 and until 1986, it was mostly funded by the Tata Group companies; then the National Centre for Performing Arts (NCPA) was formed as a trust with Marg as a division of NCPA. Since 2010 it has been functioning as an independent not-for-profit organization, The Marg Foundation.

Currently the editors are Jyotindra Jain and Naman Ahuja. Marg is one of the oldest and most respected art book publishers in India. It seeks corporate and private sponsorship to subsidize the cost of its publications.

Each year, apart from its four magazine issues it also publishes a book every quarter, and a few special publications on the subject of Indian and related art and heritage. It has also produced a series of documentary films on heritage sites and a film on Bombay/Mumbai.

History

In the 1930s, Mulk Raj Anand had moved to England, to a flourishing literary career. After World War II, he returned to India, at the juncture of its independence and started Marg magazine with "seven ads and two rooms" provided by J. R. D. Tata and with Anil de Silva from Sri Lanka as assistant editor and art historian, Karl J. Khandalavala as an advisor. The aim was to bring Indian art into world focus
 
It was in the pages of the magazine that architect Charles Correa and his colleagues first presented their proposal for a dream city in Mumbai, then Bombay, "New Bombay", later translated into policy.

Its offices are situated in the historic Army & Navy Building in Kala Ghoda, Mumbai's premier art district.

References

External links
  Marg, Official website
 Marg at Tata Group website

1946 establishments in India
English-language magazines published in India
Visual arts magazines published in India
Magazines established in 1946
Mass media in Mumbai
Quarterly magazines published in India